IAMJRDN is the official debut studio album by Canadian R&B singer JRDN. The album features the hit singles, "U Can Have It All" and "Like Magic", which peaked at #20 and #24 on the Canadian Hot 100 respectively. It was released on November 9, 2010.

Track listing

Chart positions

References

2010 albums
JRDN albums